A Darkling Plain is the fourth and final novel in the Mortal Engines Quartet series, written by British author Philip Reeve.

The novel won the 2006 Guardian Children's Fiction Prize and the 2007 Los Angeles Times Book Prize for Young Adult Fiction.

Setting
The book is set six months after Infernal Devices. Wren Natsworthy and her father Tom Natsworthy have taken to the skies in their airship, the Jenny Haniver. After the apparent death of the Stalker Fang at the end of Infernal Devices, General Naga has seized command of the Green Storm and has signed a peace treaty between the Green Storm and the Traktionstadtsgesellschaft, ushering in a new era of peace and trade. Whilst Wren is enjoying life as an aviator, Tom misses Hester, and has been informed by a doctor that his weak heart means he only has a few years left to live. The Lost Boy, Fishcake, is secretly repairing the Stalker Fang, coming to regard her as the mother he never had. Theo Ngoni has returned to Zagwa and rejoined his family.

Explanation of the novel's title
The title is derived from Matthew Arnold's poem Dover Beach. This excerpt of the poem appears at the beginning of the book:

This relates to the novel in several ways. The characters are indeed swept about, often against their will, by the "ignorant armies" of the Green Storm and Traktionstadtsgesellschaft, on the "darkling plain" of the Great Hunting Ground.

Reeve references his choice of title himself towards the end of the book when the character Nimrod Pennyroyal writes a book within a book titled Ignorant Armies.

The similarly titled, "As on a Darkling Plain", by Ben Bova in 1972 also takes its title from this poem.

Plot

Part One 
Six months after the events of Infernal Devices, General Naga, the now-leader of the Green Storm after the supposed demise of the Stalker Fang, has formed a truce with the Traktionstadtsgesellschaft, blossoming a new era of trade and peace.

Theo Ngoni, returning to his home of Zagwa and reuniting with his family, foils an assassination attempt on Oenone Zero, who is married to General Naga and has taken the title of Lady Naga. Zero was in Zagwa to facilitate peace terms with Zagwa and the Green Storm; and suspects that the attempt was made by Green Storm soldiers still loyal to the Stalker Fang. Due to the possibility of another attempt, Zero has an incognito merchant airship prepared that will take her an alternate route to Naga. As Theo saved her life, Zero wants him to accompany her; Theo agrees, hopeful that he might meet Wren. En route, Zero's servant Rohini is revealed to be Cynthia Twite, a Green Storm spy who survived the events of Infernal Devices, and attempts to kill her, but Theo intervenes. Cynthia escapes and downs the airship. The pair survive the crash, but Zero is captured by air-trader Napster Varley who plans to sell her to the Traktionstadtsgesellschaft; whilst Theo is saved from slavers by Hester Shaw and the Stalker Shrike, who is unable to kill due to Zero's tampering. After Theo informs them of Zero's capture, Hester and Shrike decide to find her, as Zero will be able to reverse Shrike's "barrier" she implemented.

Cynthia reaches Naga's base in Tienjing and lies to him that Zero was killed by the Zagwans, though Naga refuses to take action against Tractionists. Cynthia manages to weasle her way to serve in Naga's household.

In the Traction City of Peripatetiapolis, Tom Natsworthy discovers that the bullet that Nimrod Pennyroyal shot him with in Predator's Gold has damaged his heart and he has not long to live, though he doesn't tell his daughter Wren. Tom soon discovers a woman that resembles Clytie Potts, a London Apprentice Historian that he knew. When questioned, she tells him that her name is Cruwys Morchard and that she is transporting Old-Tech devices. Unconvinced, Tom and Wren decide to pursue her, travelling on the Jenny Haniver to Murnau, a Traktionstadtsgesellschaft city, where they meet Wolf von Kobold, the son of the Mayor of Murnau and commander of the traction city Harrowbarrow. Wolf believes that the survivors of MEDUSA may be still inside London, and the three agree to make an expedition to London.

Tom and Wren meet Wolf on Harrowbarrow, a burrowing Traction City, which takes them closer to London. With Wolf accompanying them, they fly the Jenny Haniver over the Green Storm border, and finally reaching the debris field of London. There they discover that the survivors of MEDUSA have rebuilt a society in London, led by Tom's old boss and now Mayor Chudleigh Pomeroy. Garamond, the paranoid head of security, convinces Pomeroy to keep them there as he suspects that they may inform others of London's survival. Tom, Wren and Wolf eventually discover a new traction town being rebuilt near the ruins, a project that was in-progress long before Magnus Crome decided to use MEDUSA. Noticing that "New London" has no wheels, the leading Engineer Dr. Childermass explains that it uses Magnetic Levitation to float above the ground, making it less harmful to the environment. Wolf slips away from the conversation and escapes back to Harrowbarrow, intent on devouring New London and to use the technology to make his city better.

Meanwhile, the former Lost Boy Fishcake has partially rebuilt the Stalker Fang in Cairo. The Stalker Fang often malfunctions, alternating in personality between the kind and supportive Anna-side and the cold and merciless Stalker-side. Fishcake informs Fang that Cairo is stopping to trade with Lost Boy-ruled Brighton where they steal a limpet and make their way to the state of Shan Guo, where the Stalker will do something "important".

Walking the rest of the way by foot, Fishcake and Fang stop at a hermitage, that is inhabited by Sathya, an exiled commander of the Green Storm and an old friend to Anna. The Anna-side of the Stalker doesn't wish to harm Sathya, and wants former London Engineer Dr. Popjoy, who resurrected her in Predator’s Gold to eliminate the Stalker-side. Despite protestations, Fishcake accompanies her to Batmunkh Gompa. However, before meeting Popjoy, the Stalker-side returns and demands that he remove the Anna-side. Popjoy explains to her that the brain he fitted her with in Rogue's Roost was from a much older model he found in the Arctic and that it was from a "Remembering Machine" that helped to keep a nomad culture alive. When Popjoy discovers that the Stalker Fang will reactivate ODIN (standing for Orbital Defence Initiative), an orbital weapon with firepower similar to MEDUSA, he protests; but the Stalker kills him. The Stalker Fang takes Fishcake with her to Erdene Tezh, her old home.

Part Two
Napster Varley arrives in Airhaven, which is floating above the Traktionstadtgesellschaft, and unsuccessfully attempts to sell Zero to Wolf's father Kriegsmarschall von Kobold. Hester, Theo and Shrike arrive at the floating city and attempt to buy her from Varley, who asks for an extortionate price which they cannot pay. Hester and Theo discover Pennyroyal hiding in Airhaven in disgrace and debt after a newspaper exposed him as a fraud. Hester takes what remains of his money and heads to Varley's ship to buy Zero, with Theo accidentally mentioning to Pennyroyal about Zero being alive. With this knowledge and seeking to reclaim fame, Pennyroyal rounds up men from Manchester and marches to Varley's ship. Discovering a photograph of Zero that Varley placed on him, von Kobold attempts to rescue her to make further peace with Naga.

Hester's attempt to cheat Varley is discovered and he attacks her, but his abused wife kills him. As Hester and Zero make their way back, von Kobold finds them and helps them. Pennyroyal arrives with the Manchester men and a fight ensues where von Kobold is shot, but survives via his Old-Tech armour. Shrike manages to scare them away and gets Hester and Zero to their airship the Shadow Aspect and escape. Pennyroyal gets into an altercation with a journalist and falls from Airhaven and is assumed dead, but lands in the rigging of the Shadow Aspect. Stalker-birds arrive but escort the airship to a Green Storm air base where they are hailed as heroes. The base is soon attacked by the Traktionstadtsgesellschaft and Harrowbarrow. All escape in an airship heading east except Theo who stays behind to retrieve a letter that Wren sent him, but is seemingly killed by a bomb shell.

Wolf returns to Harrowbarrow and meets with von Kobold and the Mayor of Manchester Adlai Browne. With support from other Traktionstadtsgesellschaft cities, Browne intends to destroy the Green Storm, despite von Kobold wanting peace. In Tienjing, Naga is informed of the Green Storm air base being attacked but does nothing, disheartened by Zero's supposed death. Cynthia has been poisoning his green tea to make him helpless further and fanatically believes that the Stalker Fang will return.

Fishcake and the Stalker Fang, whose personalities seem to be merged, steal Popjoy's air yacht and reach Erdene Tezh and her old home. Inside, she starts to create a device which will relay orders to ODIN.

Part Three
Theo survives the attack on the airfield and treks east across the plains toward London, where Wren's letter told him she would be; whilst the surviving Green Storm soldiers are transported off to Forward Command, an old traction city where Hester, Shrike and Zero were taken. Theo eventually reaches New London and is reunited with Wren, as well as warning the residents that the war between the Green Storm and the Traktionstadtsgesellschaft has restarted.

ODIN is fired upon Manchester and other cities by the Stalker Fang, killing Browne. Orla Twombley, a pilot formerly from Brighton, observes the destruction and reports to von Kobold in Murnau, telling him and the remaining cities to retreat from a Green Storm weapon. Naga receives communication that Zero is alive, and, realising that Twite has deceived him confronts her. Twite attempts to kill him, but ODIN fires on Tienjing. Naga survives but Twite is killed instantly in the blast.

The residents of New London see the firepower of ODIN from afar, and fearing that it is a Green Storm weapon, make plans to head north when the city is finished. Tom, fearing for Wren, takes the Jenny Haniver to Tienjing, hoping to convince Naga to not use his supposed weapon. Tom leaves a letter to Wren saying his goodbyes and entrusting Theo to take care for her, admitting that he is dying. Wolf hears of Manchester's destruction and is determined to continue on to London, claiming to his underlings that Harrowbarrow's creeping nature will help them survive.

Part Four
Hester, Shrike, Zero and Pennyroyal make their way to Batmunkh Gompa to reunite with Naga, who has been evacuated to there. They are told of the destruction of traction cities and Tienjing alike, which Shrike deduces is the work of the Stalker Fang. Zero intends to talk to Popjoy as he built the Stalker Fang and may know how to disable her for good.

Wren discovers Tom's letter and attempts to follow him with Theo, but they are stopped by Garamond, who believes they are Green Storm agents and are escaping to betray New London. It is revealed that Pomeroy had died in his sleep when Tom left New London and Garamond has taken his place. Garamond arrests the pair, but Childermass frees them and tells them to escape to a Green Storm settlement. It is revealed that Childermass is the mother of Bevis Pod.

Tom, flying the Jenny Haniver, is intercepted on his way to Tienjing and brought to Batmunkh Gompa, where he is interrogated by Naga. Tom pleads for Naga to not use the weapon on New London, but Naga mistakes him for a Traktionstadtsgesellschaft spy and disbelieves him. Hester and the others arrive in Batmunkh Gompa, where Zero discovers Popjoy is dead. When Zero meets with Naga, he accuses her of being a spy, believing that London is the master of the new weapon and that Popjoy faked his death to join them. Naga has Zero beaten and detained, then orders for their forces to attack London. Pennyroyal informs Hester and Shrike of Zero's predicament, and Hester is shakily reunited with Tom, who tells her that Theo is alive and with Wren in London. With Shrike, the pair escape on the Jenny Haniver. The Stalker Fang targets Zhan Shan, a volcano, with ODIN, triggering an eruption that will last for weeks and destroy many provinces. Tom and Hester deduce that the Stalker Fang has gone to Erdene Tezh and fly the Jenny Haniver there.

Wren and Theo hear Harrowbarrow approaching to devour New London. Wren boards it whilst Theo warns the Londoners of the approaching city. Wren confronts Wolf, and tricks him into diverting Harrowbarrow into an area that is full of energy left from MEDUSA. The Green Storm arrives and attacks, though Wolf continues ahead, having dealt with the Green Storm before, but Harrowbarrow is damaged by MEDUSA's left-over energy. Theo boards it and finds Wren, but Harrowbarrow starts moving again. Naga, informed of Harrowbarrow's approach, realises his error and defends New London, which finally begins to move, with Harrowbarrow in pursuit. Wolf confronts Wren and Theo on Harrowbarrow's back, but Wren accidentally kills Wolf when Naga's airship arrives and rescues them. Naga drops Wren and Theo on New London and pilots his airship straight into Harrowbarrow in a kamikaze attack, destroying the city and allowing New London to escape.

On board the Jenny Haniver, Shrike finds Pennyroyal hiding, and the three tie him up. Stalker-birds attack the airship, severely damaging it. Shrike manages to save the three from being killed, but falls out of the ship and into the mountains. The airship downs near Fang's old home, where Hester and Tom leave Pennyroyal. Fishcake, having heard the airship, confronts them and tries to kill Hester, but is stopped by the Stalker Fang. Fishcake demands she kills them, but the Stalker Fang hits him and Fishcake runs away. Tom's heart begins to strain and he collapses. The Stalker Fang, deciding not to kill them as they will all die soon enough, takes Tom into the house as Hester follows.

The Stalker Fang explains to Tom and Hester that she destroyed various traction cities and Green Storm bases to make the two sides fight each other, giving her time to send a command to ODIN. This command targets various volcanoes around the Earth, which will erupt and kill humanity in the resulting volcanic winter, but will "make the world green again". Fishcake finds Pennyroyal, and they plan to escape in Popjoy's sky-yacht, but need the keys around the Stalker Fang's neck. Pennyroyal finds an anti-Stalker weapon that Hester dropped and makes his way toward the house. Tom attempts to convince the Anna-side of the Stalker to destroy ODIN, and the Stalker flashes between the converging personalities. Pennyroyal suddenly enters and kills the Stalker Fang, which falls onto the ODIN transmitter and destroys it. Tom's heart strains and he collapses again, whilst Pennyroyal takes the key to the sky-yacht and attempt to bring it to them to save Tom. As Hester takes Tom outside, they see a twinkling star in the sky, and Hester realises that the Stalker Fang had ordered ODIN to destroy itself. Pennyroyal attempts to fly the sky-yacht to Tom and Hester, but is threatened by Fishcake to leave them behind as revenge for leaving him on Brighton. Hester watches the sky-yacht fly away, and she comforts Tom as he dies. Hester commits suicide shortly afterwards.

Zero is informed of Naga's demise, and is appointed leader of the Green Storm, which she reforms as the Anti-Traction League. She makes a treaty with von Kobold to cease fighting forever, with many traction cities subsequently becoming static. Popjoy's sky-yacht fails outside Batmunkh Gompa, and Fishcake abandons Pennyroyal, who travels back to Murnau and spends time in debtors' prison before writing a truthful account of the events he survived, titling it Ignorant Armies. However, it is never published due to his fraudulent activities, and Pennyroyal lives out the rest of his life in Peripatetiapolis with an old girlfriend. Fishcake makes his way to Sathya's hermitage, where he lives with her into adulthood and has children of his own. He comes to regret leaving Hester and Tom in Erdene Tezh, though he believes that they were resourceful enough to find a way to escape. Wren and Theo leave New London in the north a year later, and go to Zagwa to see Theo's family. When Airhaven arrives, Wren and Theo buy a new airship with Wolf's expedition money, calling it the Jenny Haniver II and become air-traders. New London thrives as it escapes predator cities and trades with anti-gravity furniture.

Miles away, Shrike revives himself and arrives at Erdene Tezh too late, finding the remains of the Stalker Fang. Although her Stalker brain is dead, Shrike downloads memories from the older part of her brain. He then finds Tom and Hester's bodies, and considers taking Hester to be Resurrected, but decides against it when he sees that they held hands when they died. As he takes their bodies, Shrike recalls his own long-lost memories of his own two children (Ruan and Fern from Fever Crumb) before he was turned into a Stalker. Laying the bodies down in an outcrop nearby, Shrike shuts down and watches their bodies decompose over the years. As the years flash by him, an oak tree grows from Hester's body, and he eventually slows this time lapse when he notices human figures nearby. Finally out of his fugue state, Shrike discovers that a forest has grown round him, and meets a girl and a boy. The pair take him down into a village, where Shrike finds that he was considered an old shrine statue, and the people hung flowers around his neck for luck.

The Stalker discovers that the village has utilised Childermass' anti-gravity machines, and that he has woken hundreds, if not thousands of years into the future. When he asks if there are any traction cities in the world, the village people explain that they are thought to be fairy tales nowadays and find the idea ridiculous. When the people ask what he was for, Shrike responds that he is a "Remembering Machine", and is asked to tell his story. Shrike starts by speaking the first lines of Mortal Engines:
"It was a dark, blustery day in spring, and the City of London was chasing a small mining town across the dried-up bed of the old North Sea..."

References

Literature
 Henry Keazor: "'Mortal Engines' und 'Infernal Devices': Architektur- und Technologie-Nostalgie bei Philip Reeve", in: Techniknostalgie und Retrotechnologie, edited by Andreas Böhn and Kurt Möser, Karlsruhe 2010, pp. 129–147

External links
 Strange Horizons review
 Science Fiction Weekly review (contains plot detail) 
 The Guardian review

Mortal Engines
Novels by Philip Reeve
British young adult novels
Children's science fiction novels
Guardian Children's Fiction Prize-winning works
British steampunk novels
Post-apocalyptic novels
Predator Cities
2006 British novels
2006 science fiction novels
2006 children's books
Scholastic Corporation books